Lake Vico is a caldera lake in the northern Lazio region, central Italy. It is one of the highest major Italian lakes, with an altitude of 510 m. Administratively, it is part of the municipalities of Caprarola and Ronciglione.

The lake is surrounded by the Cimini Hills, in particular by the Fogliano (965 m) and Venere (851 m) mountains. It is part of the Lake Vico Natural Reserve.

According to legend, the lake was created by Hercules, who defied the local inhabitants by wielding his club. When he did this, a stream sprang up and formed the lake.

Lake Vico occupies the central caldera of Vico Volcano. A volcanic cone was built up in a series of eruptions that occurred 305,000 to 258,000 years ago. Later, the eruption of voluminous pyroclastic flows, and volcanic ash, caused the progressive collapse of the volcanic cone, which created the caldera, in which Lake Vico now lies, by about 138,000 years ago.

The lake is drained by the River Vicano. Before the construction of a tunnel by the Etruscans, the lake was probably deeper than today, the Monte Venere constituting an island within it.

The area is famous for its extensive Beech forest, which is one of the most southerly in Europe.  The elevation, plus the surrounding sides of the crater, create cool enough conditions for the continued survival of the trees.  A large part of the northern side of the crater is a nature reserve to protect this forest.

Wildlife
An incomplete list of wildlife present in the Vico Natural Preserve include:

Great crested grebe, symbol of the preserve
Black kite
Common teal
Common toad
Common whitefish
Coypu
Eurasian badger
Eurasian coot
Eurasian jay
Eurasian scops owl
Fox
Great egret
Grey heron
Herman's tortoise
Lanner falcon
Little egret
Northern pike
Pine marten
Eurasian sparrowhawk
Squacco heron
Tree frog
Water rail
Wigeon
Eurasian wren
Wild cat

Nearby towns
Ronciglione
Caprarola
Viterbo
Vetralla
Capranica

Footnotes

External links
 Lake Vico VR panoramas at Tuscia 360

Vico
Vico
Vico
Falisci
Pleistocene calderas
Vico